Cows in the Pasture is an unfinished 1970 album by American talent manager and promoter Fred Vail that was produced by the Beach Boys' Brian Wilson.

Background
Vail had been the band's co-manager since 1963. He said, "A lot of times when I'd pick the Beach Boys up I'd have country stations on, and I'd sing along sometimes and they'd be teasing me. And then they'd put on the pop music stations and I'd put it back on the country stations. We were just fooling around. So they knew I sang and liked country music."

The album was recorded in five sessions, at Wally Heider Studios, Hollywood, from April 4 to April 17, and coincided with the recording of the Beach Boys' album Sunflower. Vail said that Wilson lost interest in the project halfway through: "I think once he got into it, he realized that he wasn't as comfortable doing that kind of music. ... It wasn't like a Beach Boys session. It was never finished. I think Brian did it just to get out of the house."

Wilson biographer Christian Matijas-Mecca said of the work: "we can only guess at its contents as it was neither completed nor released. It serves to show the range of projects to which Brian would commit himself, even if he was likely to lose interest before completion."

Track listing
Vail recorded vocals for five of the album's fifteen songs. The tracks with vocals are marked with (*).

 "Bethany Ann" (*)
 "There's Always Something There to Remind Me" (*)
 "Kittens Kids & Kites"
 "Lucky Billy"
 "One Woman Won't Hold Me"
 "Why Don't You Give Her to Me"
 "If You're Not Loving You're Not Living"
 "All for the Love of the Girl" (*)
 "Only the Lonely" (*)
 "Carolina on My Mind"
 "My Way of Life"
 "A Fool Such as I" (*)
 "You Pass Me By"
 "I Can't Help It If I'm Still in Love with You"

Personnel
Per Badman.

 Fred Vail – vocals
 James Burton – guitar
 Buddy Emmons – steel guitar
 Glen D. Hardin – piano
 Red Rhodes – steel guitar

See also

 The Beach Boys bootleg recordings

References

Unfinished albums
Albums produced by Brian Wilson
Brian Wilson
Country albums by American artists